"Never Miss the Water"  is a 1995 recording written by Gerry DeVeaux and Charlie Mole, and performed by American singer Chaka Khan. It features vocals by Meshell Ndegeocello and had previously been unreleased. The song was included in Khan's 1997 greatest hits album Epiphany: The Best of Chaka Khan, Vol. 1 and went to #36 on the US Billboard Hot R&B/Hip-Hop Singles & Tracks chart. On the Billboard Hot Dance Club Play chart, "Never Miss the Water" was Chaka Khan's sixth number one, and was her last until she again reached the summit with "Disrespectful" in 2007.

Critical reception
Larry Flick from Billboard wrote, "No one can kick like Chaka—and she does it with such astonishing ease. She shines like the diva she is on one of the five new songs on Epiphany: The Best Of Chaka Khan. Produced by David Gamson, the track cruises at a breezy classic funk pace, giving Miss Thing plenty of room to work her voice to maximum effect. She is bolstered by a guest rap from Me'Shell Ndegéocello, whose chatting between verses adds street spice. The original version sparkles with multiformat hit potential, while Frankie Knuckles comes to the party with a rousing house remix that will have Khan's legion of club disciples twirling with delight."

British magazine Music Week complimented "Never Miss the Water" as a "strong" track. Ralph Tee from the magazine's RM wrote, "It's not an 'I'm Every Woman' or 'Ain't Nobody', but vocally Chaka still puts virtually every one else to shame."

Charts

Cover versions
In 2003, a cover version credited to Gerry DeVeaux, Shauna Jensen, Robyn Loau and Michal Nicolas was released in Australia as the official anthem for the Sydney Gay & Lesbian Mardi Gras.

See also
 List of number-one dance singles of 1997 (U.S.)

References

1997 singles
2003 singles
Chaka Khan songs
Songs written by Gerry DeVeaux
1997 songs
Songs written by Charlie Mole
Electronic songs
House music songs
Meshell Ndegeocello songs